Baudreville is the name of several communes in France:

 Baudreville, Eure-et-Loir, in the Eure-et-Loir département 
 Baudreville, Manche, in the Manche département